Mossley Hill is a Liverpool City Council ward in the Liverpool Riverside Parliamentary constituency. It was formed for the 2004 municipal elections from the former Grassendale and Aigburth wards.

Councillors
Mossley Hill ward has returned nine councillors. Since it was formed in 2004 it has elected 5 Liberal Democrats and 4 Labour councillors. Lynnie Williams was elected for the Liberal Democrats in 2008 and then switched to be a Labour councillor in 2011, and then stood aside from the ward at the next election were a new Labour councillor was elected.

 indicates seat up for re-election after boundary changes.

 indicates seat up for re-election.

 indicates change in affiliation.

 indicates seat up for re-election after casual vacancy.

Election results

Elections of the 2010s

Elections of the 2000s 

After the boundary change of 2004 the whole of Liverpool City Council faced election. Three Councillors were returned.

• italics denotes the sitting Councillor
• bold denotes the winning candidate

Notes

References

External links
 Liverpool City Council: Ward profile

Wards of Liverpool